The British Rail Class 332 was a type of electric multiple unit passenger train built between 1997 and 1998 by CAF, with traction equipment supplied by Siemens Transportation Systems. Fourteen units were built for dedicated use on Heathrow Express services between London Paddington and Heathrow Airport.

History
Following BAA being granted rights to operate services from London Paddington to Heathrow Airport, 14 trains were ordered in July 1994 from Siemens Transportation Systems. They were built by CAF in Zaragoza, Spain. The first two were tested at the Velim railway test circuit and in Germany, while the next two were sent directly to England arriving at Old Oak Common TMD in March 1997.

The units had automatic train protection (ATP), one of the few fleets in the UK to do so. This was largely as a consequence of the Paddington-Heathrow route being mainly on the Great Western Main Line, which was equipped with ATP in the early 1990s as part of a trial of the system by British Rail. The units were not fitted with Train Protection & Warning System (TPWS). A derogation was issued in 2001, which exempted the class from mandatory TPWS installation, due to the fitment of the ATP. Given the lack of TPWS, the trains were not compatible for use elsewhere on the rail network.

The units were maintained at a purpose-built depot at Old Oak Common. Following withdrawal of the units, the depot was demolished as part of the construction of High Speed 2 and Old Oak Common station.

Operator
The Class first entered service on 19 January 1998 when services commenced from London Paddington to Heathrow Junction. They operated through to Terminal 4 from May 1998 until March 2008, when the Heathrow Express was diverted to serve Terminal 5.

The original order was for twelve three-car and two four-car sets. The twelve three-carriage sets were increased to four-car sets by the end of 1998. In 2002, five sets had a fifth car added.

2016 recall
On 29 February 2016, the entire class was withdrawn after a structural defect was found on the underside of a driving car of unit number 332014. They were replaced by Heathrow Connect Class 360s. The Class 332 trains were gradually returned to service from 11 March 2016 onwards.

Replacement
In March 2018, Heathrow Airport Holdings announced that operation of the Heathrow Express was to be contracted to Great Western Railway. However, in September 2019, Heathrow Express announced that Heathrow Airport Holdings were to continue owning Heathrow Express until at least 2028 and that instead, GWR would manage the introduction of the Class 387 to replace the Class 332.

The first unit, 332014 was sent to be scrapped in November 2020 at Sims Metal, Peterborough. The last day in service for the remaining Class 332 units was 28 December 2020. Apart from three carriages from 332001 that were retained by Siemens, the remaining sets were scrapped by Sims Metal, Newport in the first quarter of 2021.

Further use
Three cars from 332001 (63400, 72412 and 78400) are now based at Siemens Goole for private use.

Fleet details

See also
British Rail Class 333, similar units operated by Northern Trains

References

External links

332
CAF multiple units
Train-related introductions in 1998
25 kV AC multiple units